HD 64740 is a single star in the southern constellation Puppis, positioned near the line of sight to the Gum Nebula. It has a blue-white hue and is faintly visible to the naked eye with an apparent visual magnitude of 4.63. Parallax measurements give a distance estimate of approximately 760 light-years from the Sun, and it is drifting further away with a radial velocity of +8 km/s.

This is a massive B-type main-sequence star with a stellar classification of B2V. It is a magnetic chemically peculiar star of the helium strong variety with weak hydrogen alpha emission. The star is about half way through its main sequence lifetime with an estimated age of ~13 million years. The star is radiating over 5,900 times the luminosity of the Sun from its photosphere at an effective temperature of 23,700 K.

Significant X-ray emission has been detected originating from this star, which may be connected to the magnetically-confined stellar wind. The star does not display pulsation behavior, but it does show a magnetically-modulated variation from the wind. Variation of ultraviolet lines of silicon has been detected, which may be due to surface abundance variations. Two patches of helium overabundance are observed near the magnetic poles, which are inclined by about 20° to the star's pole of rotation.

References

B-type main-sequence stars
Ap stars

Puppis
CD-49 3137
064740
038500
3089